Moscow City Duma District 14 is one of 45 constituencies in Moscow City Duma. The constituency has covered parts of North-Eastern Moscow since 2014. From 1993-2005 District 14 was based in Eastern Moscow; from 2005-2009 the constituency was based in Western Moscow (it actually overlapped the entirety of State Duma Kuntsevo constituency), while from 2009-2014 — in South-Western and Western Moscow.

Members elected

Election results

2001

|-
! colspan=2 style="background-color:#E9E9E9;text-align:left;vertical-align:top;" |Candidate
! style="background-color:#E9E9E9;text-align:left;vertical-align:top;" |Party
! style="background-color:#E9E9E9;text-align:right;" |Votes
! style="background-color:#E9E9E9;text-align:right;" |%
|-
|style="background-color:"|
|align=left|Andrey Metelsky
|align=left|Independent
|
|45.30%
|-
|style="background-color:"|
|align=left|Irina Osokina (incumbent)
|align=left|Yabloko
|
|15.95%
|-
|style="background-color:"|
|align=left|Sergey Karpukhin
|align=left|Independent
|
|12.88%
|-
|style="background-color:"|
|align=left|Lyudmila Bogacheva
|align=left|Independent
|
|8.88%
|-
|style="background-color:"|
|align=left|Yury Chubar
|align=left|Liberal Democratic Party
|
|2.19%
|-
|style="background-color:#000000"|
|colspan=2 |against all
|
|11.96%
|-
| colspan="5" style="background-color:#E9E9E9;"|
|- style="font-weight:bold"
| colspan="3" style="text-align:left;" | Total
| 
| 100%
|-
| colspan="5" style="background-color:#E9E9E9;"|
|- style="font-weight:bold"
| colspan="4" |Source:
|
|}

2005

|-
! colspan=2 style="background-color:#E9E9E9;text-align:left;vertical-align:top;" |Candidate
! style="background-color:#E9E9E9;text-align:left;vertical-align:top;" |Party
! style="background-color:#E9E9E9;text-align:right;" |Votes
! style="background-color:#E9E9E9;text-align:right;" |%
|-
|style="background-color:"|
|align=left|Yevgeny Gerasimov (incumbent)
|align=left|United Russia
|
|39.66%
|-
|style="background-color:"|
|align=left|Pavel Basanets
|align=left|Communist Party
|
|13.81%
|-
|style="background-color:"|
|align=left|Aleksandr Tarnavsky (incumbent)
|align=left|Independent
|
|11.14%
|-
|style="background-color:"|
|align=left|Yury Zagrebnoy
|align=left|Yabloko-United Democrats
|
|9.65%
|-
|style="background-color:"|
|align=left|Andrey Ivanov
|align=left|Rodina
|
|9.61%
|-
|style="background-color:"|
|align=left|Vladislav Volkov
|align=left|Liberal Democratic Party
|
|3.80%
|-
|style="background-color:"|
|align=left|Pyotr Tarnavsky
|align=left|Independent
|
|2.90%
|-
|style="background-color:#DD137B"|
|align=left|Andrey Bakhurin
|align=left|Social Democratic Party
|
|2.32%
|-
|style="background-color:"|
|align=left|Andrey Kobozev
|align=left|Independent
|
|1.52%
|-
| colspan="5" style="background-color:#E9E9E9;"|
|- style="font-weight:bold"
| colspan="3" style="text-align:left;" | Total
| 
| 100%
|-
| colspan="5" style="background-color:#E9E9E9;"|
|- style="font-weight:bold"
| colspan="4" |Source:
|
|}

2009

|-
! colspan=2 style="background-color:#E9E9E9;text-align:left;vertical-align:top;" |Candidate
! style="background-color:#E9E9E9;text-align:left;vertical-align:top;" |Party
! style="background-color:#E9E9E9;text-align:right;" |Votes
! style="background-color:#E9E9E9;text-align:right;" |%
|-
|style="background-color:"|
|align=left|Vladimir Platonov (incumbent)
|align=left|United Russia
|
|48.84%
|-
|style="background-color:"|
|align=left|Nikolay Gubenko
|align=left|Communist Party
|
|32.06%
|-
|style="background-color:"|
|align=left|Maksim Chirkov
|align=left|A Just Russia
|
|9.96%
|-
|style="background-color:"|
|align=left|Aleksey Folvarkov
|align=left|Liberal Democratic Party
|
|4.56%
|-
| colspan="5" style="background-color:#E9E9E9;"|
|- style="font-weight:bold"
| colspan="3" style="text-align:left;" | Total
| 
| 100%
|-
| colspan="5" style="background-color:#E9E9E9;"|
|- style="font-weight:bold"
| colspan="4" |Source:
|
|}

2014

|-
! colspan=2 style="background-color:#E9E9E9;text-align:left;vertical-align:top;" |Candidate
! style="background-color:#E9E9E9;text-align:left;vertical-align:top;" |Party
! style="background-color:#E9E9E9;text-align:right;" |Votes
! style="background-color:#E9E9E9;text-align:right;" |%
|-
|style="background-color:"|
|align=left|Valery Telichenko
|align=left|United Russia
|
|43.27%
|-
|style="background-color:"|
|align=left|Yulia Mikhaylova
|align=left|Communist Party
|
|25.22%
|-
|style="background-color:"|
|align=left|Maksim Kruglov
|align=left|Yabloko
|
|16.00%
|-
|style="background-color:"|
|align=left|Aleksey Kryukov
|align=left|Liberal Democratic Party
|
|6.56%
|-
|style="background-color:"|
|align=left|Dmitry Zakharov
|align=left|A Just Russia
|
|5.68%
|-
| colspan="5" style="background-color:#E9E9E9;"|
|- style="font-weight:bold"
| colspan="3" style="text-align:left;" | Total
| 
| 100%
|-
| colspan="5" style="background-color:#E9E9E9;"|
|- style="font-weight:bold"
| colspan="4" |Source:
|
|}

2019

|-
! colspan=2 style="background-color:#E9E9E9;text-align:left;vertical-align:top;" |Candidate
! style="background-color:#E9E9E9;text-align:left;vertical-align:top;" |Party
! style="background-color:#E9E9E9;text-align:right;" |Votes
! style="background-color:#E9E9E9;text-align:right;" |%
|-
|style="background-color:"|
|align=left|Maksim Kruglov
|align=left|Yabloko
|
|39.32%
|-
|style="background-color:"|
|align=left|Natalya Pochinok
|align=left|Independent
|
|22.78%
|-
|style="background-color:"|
|align=left|Georgy Fedorov
|align=left|A Just Russia
|
|13.08%
|-
|style="background-color:"|
|align=left|Aleksandr Shkolnikov
|align=left|Independent
|
|8.60%
|-
|style="background-color:"|
|align=left|Yevgeny Stepkin
|align=left|Liberal Democratic Party
|
|5.93%
|-
|style="background-color:"|
|align=left|Dmitry Klochkov
|align=left|Independent
|
|5.19%
|-
| colspan="5" style="background-color:#E9E9E9;"|
|- style="font-weight:bold"
| colspan="3" style="text-align:left;" | Total
| 
| 100%
|-
| colspan="5" style="background-color:#E9E9E9;"|
|- style="font-weight:bold"
| colspan="4" |Source:
|
|}

Notes

References

Moscow City Duma districts